Brimpsfield is a village in Gloucestershire, England.

The village is recorded in Domesday Book as Brimesfelde. Brimpsfield Castle was built in the village during the Norman period. The manor of Brimpsfield was granted to Maurice de Berkeley in 1339 by King Edward III.

The Church of St Michael was built in the 12th century. It is a grade I listed building.

A fictional Brimpsfield is the home village of Peter and Abby Grant in the 1970s BBC TV series Survivors; it is shown to have a railway connection to London.

References

External links

Villages in Gloucestershire
Cotswold District